Jiaoxi may refer to the following places:

Jiaoxi Commandery, a historical commandery of China
Jiaoxi, Liuyang, a township in Liuyang, Hunan, China
Jiaoxi, Yilan, a township in northern Yilan County, Taiwan